Gouyave is the capital and largest town in the parish of St John, Grenada. It is located on the west coast of the Grenada.

History
Originally called Charlotte Town after Queen Charlotte of Britain, it was renamed Gouyave by the French because of its guava trees.

Culture

One of the town's annual celebrations is Fisherman's Birthday. On 29 June fishermen come from all over Grenada for competitive boat racing, entertainment, fish foods, and many other activities. Also, every Friday the town celebrates "Fish Friday," a weekly festival that offers a wide range of fish dishes and entertainment. Fish Friday was founded to promote community development in Gouyave and the overall Parish of St. John's by promoting it as a fishing village.
The town is also famous for its nutmeg processing plant.

References

External links
http://www.gogouyave.com
http://www.travelgrenada.com/kirani-james.html

Populated places in Grenada